David Brian Maxcy (born May 4, 1971) is a former Major League Baseball pitcher who played for the Detroit Tigers for two seasons. He pitched 41 games during the 1995 Detroit Tigers season, and pitched two more during the 1996 Detroit Tigers season.

External links

1971 births
Living people
Detroit Tigers players
Major League Baseball pitchers
Baseball players from Mississippi
Ole Miss Rebels baseball players
Bristol Tigers players
Fayetteville Generals players
Trenton Thunder players
Toledo Mud Hens players
Louisville Redbirds players
Memphis Redbirds players
Norfolk Tides players
New Orleans Zephyrs players